Paraburkholderia silvatlantica is a gram-negative, catalase and oxidase-positive nitrogen-fixing bacterium from the genus Paraburkholderia and the family Burkholderiaceae which was isolated from the rhizosphere of maize in Seropédica in Rio de Janeiro. Colonies of Paraburkholderia silvatlantica are cream-coloured with yellow in the centre.

References

silvatlantica
Bacteria described in 2006